Mycobacterium asiaticum is a slowly growing photochromogenic mycobacterium first isolated from monkeys in 1965.  M. asiaticum can, but rarely, causes human pulmonary disease.

Description
Microscopy
Gram-positive, nonmotile, acid-fast, coccoid rods.

Colony characteristics
Dysgonic and yellow photochromogenic (pigment not produced in the dark) colonies.

Physiology
Slow growth on Löwenstein-Jensen medium at 37 °C after 15–21 days.

Differential characteristics
Unique 16S rRNA sequence.
Biochemically M. asiaticum (photochromogenic) and Mycobacterium gordonae (scotochromogenic) can only be differentiated by the mode of pigmentation.

Pathogenesis
Rarely causes human pulmonary disease.

Type strain
First isolated from monkeys in 1965.
Strain ATCC 25276 = CCUG 29115 = CIP 106809 = DSM 44297 = JCM 6409.

References

SKERMAN (V.B.D.), McGOWAN (V.) and SNEATH (P.H.A.) (editors): Approved Lists of Bacterial Names. Int. J. Syst. Bacteriol., 1980, 30, 225–420. [WEISZFEILER (J.), KARASSEVA (G.V.) and KARCZAG (E.): A new Mycobacterium species: Mycobacterium asiaticum n. sp. Acta Microbiologica Academiae Scientiarum Hungaricae, 1971, 18, 247–252.

External links
Type strain of Mycobacterium asiaticum at BacDive -  the Bacterial Diversity Metadatabase

Acid-fast bacilli
asiaticum
Bacteria described in 1971